Matika Arthakornsiripho (born May 9, 1986 in Bangkok, Thailand) is a Thai model and actress. Her nickname is Bee.  Her film roles include Nang Sib Song, Prasuton Manorah and Uttai Tawee.

At the end of 2006, Matika temporarily left the film world to participate in a photo shoot for a Thai magazine. Fans consider her one of the hottest models and actresses in Thailand.  Recently she has been used in several photo shoots for Thai magazines, and she also appeared in one film, Moneah Nang Ree.

After her two most recent film releases, Nang Sib Song and Prasuton Manorah, a rumor circulated through Thailand that Matika and her co-star Sapol Chonnawee (สพล ชนวีร์) were dating. However, a TV show revealed that this film couple are truly brother and sister in reality.

Filmography

References

External links 
 Thai Profile
 Bee Fan club

1986 births
Living people
Matika Arthakornsiripho
Matika Arthakornsiripho
Matika Arthakornsiripho
Matika Arthakornsiripho
Matika Arthakornsiripho
Matika Arthakornsiripho
Matika Arthakornsiripho